George Williams  (born 1862) was a Welsh international footballer. He was part of the Wales national football team between 1893 and 1898, playing 6 matches. He played his first match on 18 March 1893 against Scotland and his last match on 19 February 1898 against Ireland. At club level, he played for Chirk.

See also
 List of Wales international footballers (alphabetical)

References

1862 births
Welsh footballers
Wales international footballers
Chirk AAA F.C. players
Place of birth missing
Year of death missing
Association footballers not categorized by position